Sir Edward Waterfield Hayward (10 November 1903 – 13 August 1983) was an Australian businessman, best known for owning and managing John Martin's, a chain of department stores in Adelaide, South Australia, and for instigating the Adelaide Christmas Pageant.

Hayward was born in Adelaide, South Australia and was educated at St Peter's College, Adelaide, where he took up polo among other sports in which he excelled. After completing his education, Hayward worked as a jackaroo in New South Wales for several years. He started in the retail sector for the first time in 1929, working for Sydney Snow and Co. Ltd., and moved back to Adelaide in 1931 to join the family business, John Martin's.

One of his first jobs at John Martin's was to visit Canada and the United States to gather ideas from department stores in those countries. It was on this trip that he came up with the idea to start the Adelaide Christmas Pageant, being in particular inspired by the Toronto Santa Claus Parade and by Macy's Thanksgiving Day Parade in New York City. Since the first pageant in 1933, it has become a much loved Adelaide tradition.

During World War II Hayward served in the Australian Army; he was 36 when he enlisted in the army. During the war Hayward noted the popularity of the soft drink Coca-Cola with the Americans. After the war Hayward established a franchise to bottle and sell Coca-Cola in Adelaide. He served either as president or chairman of the franchise for a total of 33 years.

Hayward was chairman of the St John Council in South Australia when, in 1952, it became responsible for ambulance services in that state, and he was made a Knight of the Order in 1959.

He was made a Knight Bachelor on 10 June 1961.

Hayward and his wife, Ursula (née Barr-Smith), were art enthusiasts and built up a magnificent art collection in their Adelaide home "Carrick Hill". The house, its lands, and the collection were bequeathed to the state on Hayward's death (Lady Hayward having died before him), and now form a museum and cultural centre.

References

Christmas Pageant creator dies at 79, The Advertiser, 15 August 1983, p. 14
Cockburn, Stewart. Ideas man who led parade, The Advertiser, 15 July 1983, p. 6

1983 deaths
1903 births
Australian colonels
20th-century Australian businesspeople
Australian businesspeople in retailing
Australian Army personnel of World War II
Australian Knights Bachelor
Businesspeople from Adelaide
People educated at St Peter's College, Adelaide